Lake Lucerne is a neighborhood in Miami Gardens, Florida. It is formerly a census-designated place. The population was 9,132 at the time of the 2000 United States census.

Geography
Lake Lucerne is located at  (25.965420, -80.253858).

According to the United States Census Bureau, the CDP has a total area of 6.8 km2 (2.6 mi2). 6.8 km2 (2.6 mi2) of it is land and 0.38% is water.

Demographics

As of the census of 2000, there were 9,132 people, 2,631 households, and 2,117 families residing in the CDP. The population density was 1,350.9/km2 (3,492.3/mi2). There were 2,835 housing units at an average density of 419.4/km2 (1,084.2/mi2). The racial makeup of the CDP was 11.09% White (1.5% were Non-Hispanic White,) 83.75% African American, 0.19% Native American, 0.16% Asian, 0.01% Pacific Islander, 2.54% from other races, and 2.26% from two or more races. Hispanic or Latino of any race were 14.82% of the population.

There were 2,631 households, out of which 39.3% had children under the age of 18 living with them, 39.6% were married couples living together, 33.8% had a female householder with no husband present, and 19.5% were non-families. 15.0% of all households were made up of individuals, and 3.5% had someone living alone who was 65 years of age or older. The average household size was 3.47 and the average family size was 3.83.

In the CDP, the population was spread out, with 33.5% under the age of 18, 10.8% from 18 to 24, 28.0% from 25 to 44, 20.8% from 45 to 64, and 7.0% who were 65 years of age or older. The median age was 29 years. For every 100 females, there were 88.4 males. For every 100 females age 18 and over, there were 80.8 males.

The median income for a household in the CDP was $35,166, and the median income for a family was $37,027. Males had a median income of $25,281 versus $22,031 for females. The per capita income for the CDP was $13,482. About 15.8% of families and 16.5% of the population were below the poverty line, including 22.1% of those under age 18 and 17.7% of those age 65 or over.

As of 2000, before being annexed to Miami Gardens, English as a first language accounted for 82.27% of all residents, while Spanish accounted for 14.16%, French Creole was at 2.55%, and French as a mother tongue made up 1.00% of the population.

Education
The Miami-Dade County Public Schools operate area public schools. Those in the former CDP include:
 North County K-8 Center
 Robert Renick Education Center (alternative)

Religion
Antioch Mission Baptist Church of Miami Gardens is in the former CDP.

Recreation
Calder Casino is in the former Lake Lucerne CDP.

References

Further reading
  - Pages 1 and 2
 The 1990 U.S. Census Bureau map of Dade County, Florida has this CDP on Page 3

External links
 City of Miami Gardens official website

Former census-designated places in Miami-Dade County, Florida
Neighborhoods in Miami Gardens, Florida
Former census-designated places in Florida